During the 2009–10 season Cowdenbeath competed in the Scottish Second Division, Scottish Cup, Scottish League Cup and the Challenge Cup.

Summary
Cowdenbeath finished third in the First Division, entering the play-offs winning 3–0 over Brechin on aggregate and were promoted to the First Division. They reached the third round of the Scottish Cup, the first round of the League Cup and were eliminated in the second round of the Challenge Cup.

Results & fixtures

Scottish Second Division

First Division play-offs

Challenge Cup

League Cup

Scottish Cup

League table

Player statistics

Squad 

|}
a.  Includes other competitive competitions, including playoffs and the Scottish Challenge Cup.

References

Cowdenbeath
Cowdenbeath F.C. seasons